A ladder is a vertical or inclined set of rungs or steps used for climbing or descending. There are two types: rigid ladders that are self-supporting or that may be leaned against a vertical surface such as a wall, and rollable ladders, such as those made of rope or aluminium, that may be hung from the top. The vertical members of a rigid ladder are called stringers or rails (US) or stiles (UK). Rigid ladders are usually portable, but some types are permanently fixed to a structure, building, or equipment. They are commonly made of metal, wood, or fiberglass, but they have been known to be made of tough plastic.

Historical usages
Ladders are ancient tools and technology. A ladder is featured in a Mesolithic rock painting that is at least 10,000 years old, depicted in the Spider Caves in Valencia, Spain. The painting depicts two humans using a ladder to reach a wild honeybee nest to harvest honey. The ladder is depicted as long and flexible, possibly made out of some sort of grass.

Variations

Rigid ladders

Rigid ladders are available in many forms, such as:

 Accommodation ladder, portable steps down the side of a ship for boarding.
 Assault ladder, used in siege warfare to assist in climbing walls and crossing moats.
 Attic ladder, pulled down from the ceiling to allow access to an attic or loft.
 , a ladder laid horizontally to act as a passage between two points separated by a drop.
 Boarding ladder, a ladder used to climb onto a vehicle. May be rigid or flexible, also boarding step(s), and swim ladder.
 Cat ladder (US chicken ladder), a lightweight ladder frame used on steep roofs to prevent workers from sliding.
 Christmas tree ladder, a type of boarding ladder for divers which has a single central rail and is open at the sides to allow the diver to climb the ladder while wearing swimfins.
 , a fixed ladder with a lower sliding part.  A system of counterweights is used to let the lower sliding part descend gently when released.
 Extension ladder or "telescopic ladder", a fixed ladder divided into two or more lengths for more convenient storage; the lengths can be slid together for storage or slid apart to expand the length of the ladder; a pulley system may be fitted so that the ladder can be easily extended by an operator on the ground then locked in place using the dogs and pawls. 65 ft (20 m), 50 ft (15 m) and some 35 ft (10 m) extension ladders for fire service use "bangor poles", "tormentor poles" or "stay poles" to help raise, pivot, steady, extend, place, retract and lower them due to the heavy weight. 
 Fixed ladder, two side members joined by several rungs; affixed to structure with no moving parts.
 , a ladder in the step ladder style with one or more (usually no more than three) one-way hinges. Ideal for use on uneven ground (e.g. stairs), as a trestle or when fully extended a Fixed ladder. Some variations feature a central one-way hinge with extensible locking legs.
 Hook ladder or pompier ladder, a rigid ladder with a hook at the top to grip a windowsill; used by firefighters.
 Mobile Safety Steps are self-supporting structures that have wheels or castors making them easy to move. They sometimes have a small upper platform and a hand rail to assist in moving up and down the steps.
 Orchard ladder, a three legged step ladder with the third leg made so that it can be inserted between tree branches for fruit picking.
 , a step ladder with a large platform area and a top handrail for the user to hold while working on the platform.
 , a ladder that looks like a drainpipe but can be deployed instantly when required.
 Roof ladder, a rigid ladder with a large hook at the top to grip the ridge of a pitched roof.
 , also known as a builder's ladder, has sections that come apart and are interchangeable so that any number of sections can be connected.
 Step ladder, a self-supporting portable ladder hinged in the middle to form an inverted V, with stays to keep the two halves at a fixed angle. Step ladders have flat steps and a hinged back.
 Swim ladder, a ladder used by swimmers to get out of the water, often on boats.
 , commonly used to refer to a hybrid between a step ladder and an extension ladder with 360-degree hinges; has three parts and can be taken apart to form two step ladders; e.g. Little Giant.
 , an "A-Frame"-style ladder with a telescoping center section.
 Turntable ladder, an extension ladder fitted to rotating platform on top of a fire truck.
 Vertically rising ladder, designed to climb high points and facilitate suspending at said high points.
 X-deck ladder, a US patented ladder design that is a combination ladder and scaffold.

Rigid ladders were originally made of wood, but in the 20th century aluminium became more common because of its lighter weight. Ladders with fiberglass stiles are used for working on or near overhead electrical wires, because fiberglass is an electrical insulator. Henry Quackenbush patented the extension ladder in 1867.

Flexible ladders

Rope ladders or Jacob's ladders are used where storage space is extremely limited, weight must be kept to a minimum, or in instances where the object to be climbed is too curved to use a rigid ladder. They may have rigid or flexible rungs. Climbing a rope ladder requires more skill than climbing a rigid ladder, because the ladder tends to swing like a pendulum. Jacob's ladders used on a ship are used mostly for emergencies or for temporary access to the side of a ship. Steel and aluminum wire ladders are sometimes used in vertical caving, having developed from rope ladders with wooden rungs. Flexible ladders are also sometimes used as swim ladders on boats.

Uses
Dissipative ladders are portable ladders built to ESD (Electrostatic Discharge) standard. Electrostatic Discharge is a natural occurrence in which electricity is passed through the body, or other conductors, and discharges onto some object. For example, the shock sometimes felt when a doorknob is touched is an ESD. This natural occurrence is a very important topic in the field of electronics assembly due to the costly damage ESDs can cause to sensitive electronic equipment. Dissipative ladders are ladders with controlled electrical resistance: the resistance slows the transfer of charge from one point to another, offering increased protection during ESD events: ≥105 and < 1012 Ω / square.
Boarding and pool ladders, also swim ladders and dive ladders. A ladder may be used on the side or stern of a boat, to climb into it from the water, and in a swimming pool, to climb out and sometimes in. Swimming pool ladders are usually made from plastic, wood or metal steps with a textured upper surface for grip and metal rails at the sides to support the steps and as handrails for the user, and are usually fixed in place. Boarding ladders for boats may be fixed, but are usually portable, and often fold away when not in use to avoid drag when under way. Boarding ladders may also be used for other types of vehicle, or boarding steps which are supported directly by the vehicle structure.
Assault ladders

Safety

The most common injury made by ladder climbers is bruising from falling off a ladder, but bone fractures are common and head injuries are also likely, depending on the nature of the accident. Ladders can cause injury if they slip on the ground and fall. To avoid this, they tend to have plastic feet or base pads which increase friction with the ground. However, if the plastic is badly worn, the aluminium may contact the ground increasing the chance of an accident. Ladder stabilizers are also available to increase the ladder's grip on the ground. One of the first ladder stabilizers or ladder feet was offered in 1936 and today they are standard equipment on most large ladders.

A ladder standoff, or stay, is a device fitted to the top of a ladder to hold it away from the wall. This enables the ladder to clear overhanging obstacles, such as the eaves of a roof, and increases the safe working height for a given length of ladder because of the increased separation distance of the two contact points at the top of the ladder.

It has become increasingly common to provide anchor points on buildings to which the top rung of an extension ladder can be attached, especially for activities like window cleaning, especially if a fellow worker is not available for "footing" the ladder. Footing occurs when another worker stands on the lowest rung and so provides much greater stability to the ladder when being used. However footing a ladder should be seen as a last resort for a safe placement. The anchor point is usually a ring cemented into a slot in the brick wall to which the rungs of a ladder can be attached using rope for example, or a carabiner.

If a leaning ladder is placed at the wrong angle, the risk of a fall is greatly increased. The safest angle for a ladder is 75.5°; if it is too shallow, the bottom of the ladder is at risk of sliding, and if it is too steep, the ladder may fall backwards. This angle is achieved by following the 4 to 1 rule for a ladder placed on a vertical wall: for every four feet of vertical height, the ladder foot should move one foot from the wall. Both scenarios can cause significant injury, and are especially important in industries like construction, which require heavy use of ladders.

Ladder classes
The European Union and the United Kingdom established a ladder certification system – ladder classes – for any ladders manufactured or sold in Europe. The certification classes apply solely to ladders that are portable such as stepladders and extension ladders and are broken down into three types of certification. Each ladder certification is colour-coded to indicate the amount of weight the ladder is designed to hold, the certification class and its use. The color of the safety label specifies the class and use.
 Class 1 ladder – for heavy-duty industrial uses, maximum load of 175 kg. Colour-coded blue to identify.
 Class EN141 ladders – for commercial uses, maximum load of 150 kg. No specific colour code..
 Class III ladders – for light, domestic uses, maximum load of 125 kg. Colour-coded red to identify.

Society and culture 
A common superstition in English-speaking countries is that walking under a ladder is seen as bad luck. Some sources claim that this stems from the image of a ladder being propped up against a wall looking similar to a gallows, while others attribute it to ancient Egyptian traditions involving pyramids and triangles representing the trinity of the gods, and passing through the triangular shape made by a ladder against a wall was seen as desecration. Ladders have also been linked to the crucifixion of Christ, with author and scientist Charles Panati noting that many believe a ladder rested against the crucifix that Christ hung from, making it a symbol of wickedness, betrayal and death. In comedic children's media, the image of a character walking under a ladder being the cause or result of bad luck has become a common trope.

Image gallery

See also

Scala naturae

References

External links

 OSHA Ladder guidelines including OSHA approved rung spacing requirements, etc.
 CDC – NIOSH Update – New NIOSH Smart Phone App Addresses Ladder Safety
 Ladders 101 - American Ladder Institute. Includes use & care of different types of ladders, ladder terms & links to safety standards.